Kinderhook (Kinderhoek in Dutch) is a village in the town of Kinderhook in Columbia County, New York, United States. The village population was 1,211 at the 2010 census. The village of Kinderhook is located in the south-central part of the town on US 9. The eighth President of the United States, Martin Van Buren, was born in Kinderhook and retired to the area (Lindenwald).

History
The area was named by Henry Hudson in 1609 as Kinderhoek (Dutch for "children's corner") because he had seen Native American children frequently playing there. First settled by the Dutch around 1640, the area was surrendered to the English in 1664.

In 1686, the area was granted the Great Kinderhook Patent and organized into one township.

Much of the area's growth did not occur until the 19th century - in 1813, the village had only twenty dwellings. By 1843, the number had grown to 86, and just seven years later, there were about 200 buildings and 1,400 inhabitants. The size of the village has remained steady since then, and the Kinderhook Village District has been listed on the National Register of Historic Places since 1974. In 1838, Kinderhook was chartered as a village.

United States President Martin Van Buren was born in the town of Kinderhook, and was known as "Old Kinderhook", which was sometimes abbreviated as "O.K." Thus some sources attribute the use of the phrase "OK" to Van Buren and his supporters. The home where he was raised, his father's tavern, no longer exists; however, a historical marker is located near the site at 46 Hudson Street.

U.S. Route 9 runs through the village.

Geography
Kinderhook is located at  (42.393707, -73.705094).

Kinderhook Creek, a tributary of the Hudson River, forms the southeastern boundary of the village.

Demographics

As of the census of 2000, there were 1,275 people, 546 households, and 361 families residing in the village. The population density was 667.7 people per square mile (257.7/km2). There were 576 housing units at an average density of 301.7 per square mile (116.4/km2). The racial makeup of the village was 98.12% White, 0.63% Black or African American, 0.24% Native American, 0.08% Asian, 0.08% from other races, and 0.86% from two or more races. Hispanic or Latino of any race were 1.41% of the population.

There were 546 households, out of which 29.5% had children under the age of 18 living with them, 56.4% were married couples living together, 6.8% had a female householder with no husband present, and 33.7% were non-families. 29.9% of all households were made up of individuals, and 13.2% had someone living alone who was 65 years of age or older. The average household size was 2.34 and the average family size was 2.91.

In the village, the population was spread out, with 23.5% under the age of 18, 4.9% from 18 to 24, 23.7% from 25 to 44, 29.4% from 45 to 64, and 18.5% who were 65 years of age or older. The median age was 44 years. For every 100 females, there were 92.0 males. For every 100 females age 18 and over, there were 91.9 males.

The median income for a household in the village was $57,500, and the median income for a family was $69,115. Males had a median income of $46,827 versus $29,545 for females. The per capita income for the village was $29,047. About 0.3% of families and 2.3% of the population were below the poverty line, including 2.5% of those under age 18 and 2.9% of those age 65 or over.

Education
Kinderhook is part of  the Ichabod Crane Central School District.

Notable people
George McClellan, U.S. congressman
Mordecai Myers, member of the New York State Assembly
Martin Van Buren, 8th U.S. President

Sister city 

  Buren, Netherlands

References

External links

 Village of Kinderhook official website
 Kinderhook information
 A History of Old Kinderhook, by Edward A. Collier. Originally published by The Knickerbocker Press, New York, 1914

Villages in New York (state)
Villages in Columbia County, New York
Martin Van Buren
Dutch-American culture in New York (state)
1640 establishments in the Dutch Empire